The 83rd Infantry Division (83. Infanterie-Division) was a formation of the Imperial German Army in World War I.  The division was formed in November 1914 as the "Division Posen 1", part of the Posen Corps (Korps Posen), and became the 83rd Infantry Division in June 1915.  It was initially formed from the garrison infantry regiments of Fortress Posen (Festung Posen).  The division was disbanded in 1919 during the demobilization of the German Army after World War I.

Combat chronicle

Division Posen 1 initially served on the Eastern Front, fighting in Poland, including at the 1914 Battle of Łódź, and then spent most of the period until mid-1915 fighting along the Rawka and Bzura Rivers. On June 2, 1915, it became the 83rd Infantry Division.  It fought on the Narew River in July and August 1915 and participated in the capture of Białystok on August 26, 1915, and the subsequent conquest of Grodno.  Until April 1917, it occupied the line along the Berezina River and was then along the Servech and Shchara Rivers for several months.  It remained in the Bukovina region until the armistice on the Eastern Front.  In March 1918, the division was sent to the Western Front, where it initially occupied the line in Lorraine and then moved to Flanders.  It went to the Somme region in August and returned to Lorraine in September, where it was for the remainder of the war.  Allied intelligence rated the division as fourth class.

Order of battle on formation

The 83rd Infantry Division was formed as a square division.  The order of battle of the division on June 14, 1915, was as follows:

165. Infanterie-Brigade
Infanterie-Regiment Nr. 329
Infanterie-Regiment Nr. 330
166. Infanterie-Brigade
Infanterie-Regiment Nr. 331
Infanterie-Regiment Nr. 332
Ersatz-Eskadron/Ulanen-Regiment (1. Brandenburgisches) Nr. 3
5.Landsturm-Eskadron/V. Armeekorps
Stab Feldartillerie-Regiment Nr. 55
Ersatz-Abteilung/2. Großherzoglich-Hessisches Feldartillerie-Regiment Nr. 61
1. Ersatz-Abteilung/Feldartillerie-Regiment von Podbielski (1. Niederschlesisches) Nr. 5
Fußartillerie-Bataillon Nr. 112
Landwehr-Pionier-Kompanie/XIX. Armeekorps

Late-war order of battle

The division underwent a number of organizational changes over the course of the war.  It was triangularized in September 1917, losing the 332nd Infantry Regiment.  Cavalry was reduced, artillery and signals commands were formed, and combat engineer support was expanded to a full pioneer battalion.  The order of battle on April 15, 1918, was as follows:

165. Infanterie-Brigade
Infanterie-Regiment Nr. 329
Infanterie-Regiment Nr. 330
Infanterie-Regiment Nr. 331
3. Eskadron/Dragoner-Regiment von Wedel (Pommersches) Nr. 11
Artillerie-Kommandeur 80
Feldartillerie-Regiment Nr. 249
III.Bataillon/Fußartillerie-Regiment Nr. 28
Stab Pionier-Bataillon Nr. 83
1.Landwehr-Pionier-Kompanie/I. Armeekorps
1.Landwehr-Pionier-Kompanie/V. Armeekorps
Minenwerfer-Kompanie Nr. 83
Divisions-Nachrichten-Kommandeur 83

References
 Division-Posen-1 (Chronik 1914/1915) - Der erste Weltkrieg
 83. Infanterie-Division (Chronik 1915/1918) - Der erste Weltkrieg
 Hermann Cron et al., Ruhmeshalle unserer alten Armee (Berlin, 1935)
 Hermann Cron, Geschichte des deutschen Heeres im Weltkriege 1914-1918 (Berlin, 1937)
 Günter Wegner, Stellenbesetzung der deutschen Heere 1825-1939. (Biblio Verlag, Osnabrück, 1993), Bd. 1
 Histories of Two Hundred and Fifty-One Divisions of the German Army which Participated in the War (1914-1918), compiled from records of Intelligence section of the General Staff, American Expeditionary Forces, at General Headquarters, Chaumont, France 1919 (1920)

Notes

Infantry divisions of Germany in World War I
Military units and formations established in 1914
Military units and formations disestablished in 1919
1914 establishments in Germany